Christian Camilo Marrugo Rodríguez (born 18 July 1985), is a professional footballer who plays for Rionegro Águilas. He plays the position of attacking midfielder.

Club career
Marrugo played for the Bolivar Department soccer and indoor soccer teams in all categories U10, U14, U16. When he was 15 years old, he traveled from Cartagena to Cali, where he stayed a couple of years before arriving to Medellín to join Atlético Nacional where he won the Colombian League in 2005. He was then transferred from Atlético Nacional to Independiente Santa Fe and also promoted to the Senior Colombia national football team.

He was later traded to Deportes Tolima for Anchico and on November 2012, to CF Pachuca.

For the year 2014, Deportivo Cali acquired Marrugo to enforce the midfield for coming tournaments like Copa Libertadores and Liga Postobón. For the second semester of 2014, he was signed by Independiente Medellín on a six-months loan to reinforce the red and blue team. In 2016, he helped Independiente Medellín win their sixth league championship, scoring a brace in the final against Junior. Since then, he has been known as Marrugol. For The second season of Águila League 2016 he finished as the forward with more goals in DIM.

International career
He played with the Colombia national under-20 football team at the 2005 South American Youth Championship, which Colombia hosted and won. He then competed at the 2005 FIFA World Youth Championship in the Netherlands, helping Colombia to the Round of 16 before losing to eventual champion Argentina.

Personal life
Marrugo and his family have strong sports habits, his brother Camilo Marrugo has also played a couple of professional games in the Colombian league with Real Cartagena and Cúcuta Deportivo.

External links
 
 
 

1985 births
Living people
Colombian footballers
Colombian expatriate footballers
Colombia international footballers
Colombia under-20 international footballers
Sportspeople from Cartagena, Colombia
Association football midfielders
Atlético Nacional footballers
Independiente Santa Fe footballers
Deportes Tolima footballers
C.F. Pachuca players
C.D. Veracruz footballers
Deportivo Cali footballers
Independiente Medellín footballers
Club Puebla players
Millonarios F.C. players
Águilas Doradas Rionegro players
Categoría Primera A players
Liga MX players
Expatriate footballers in Mexico
Colombian expatriate sportspeople in Mexico